Borggarden Valley is a broad ice-filled valley about  long, lying between Borg Mountain and Veten Mountain in the northwest part of Borg Massif, Queen Maud Land. It was mapped by Norwegian cartographers from surveys and from air photos by the Norwegian–British–Swedish Antarctic Expedition (1949–52) and named "Borggarden" (the castle courtyard).

References 

Valleys of Queen Maud Land
Princess Martha Coast